Claude Le Roy (born 6 February 1948) is a French football manager and former player, who gained prominence at international level as coach to the Senegal and Ghana national teams. He was most recently the manager of the Togo national team.

Managerial career
Le Roy has had a varied managerial career, starting out at the small French club Amiens SC, after taking over as manager when his playing days ended. His achievements in leading the Cameroon national team to be runners-up in the 1986 African Cup of Nations, and then champions in the 1988 competition, are often cited as his greatest managerial accomplishments. He then took charge of Senegal when they reached the quarterfinals at the 1992 African Cup of Nations, and returned to Cameroon to lead them during the World Cup in 1998. In between, he also coached Malaysia national team from 1994 to 1995.

After undertaking the role of football adviser at A.C. Milan in 1996, Le Roy had a spell as Director of Football at Paris Saint-Germain in the 1997–98 season. Le Roy became manager of Cambridge United for a short spell in 2004, although he only ever signed a "moral contract", and now claims he was only ever assisting his protégé Hervé Renard: "I was just helping out a friend [then-manager Hervé Renard], but we saved that club". Following his departure from Cambridge, Le Roy was appointed as the head coach of the DR Congo. In September 2006, Le Roy was named by the Ghana Football Association as coach of the Ghana national team.

In February 2008, Le Roy led Ghana to 14th position in the FIFA World Rankings, their highest position ever, but quit the post in May 2008.

He started coaching the Oman national team in July 2008. Oman desperately needed a solid coach after disappointing Gulf Cup and Asian Cup performances, and in January 2009, Le Roy led them to victory in the 19th Arabian Gulf Cup held in Muscat. During the competition, Le Roy extended his deal with Oman for a further four years.

He became the new coach of the Syria national team in March 2011, but resigned in May of the same year.

On 5 December 2013, he became the new coach of the Congo national team. On 17 November 2015, Le Roy resigned after leading the team to the qualifying round of the World Cup in 2018.

On 6 April 2016, Le Roy was named as the new coach of the Togo national team, replacing Tom Saintfiet. He resigned on 12 April 2021 having failed to lead the side to the African Cup of Nations.

Awards
On 24 August 2018, Liberian president George Weah decorated Arsène Wenger and Le Roy by the insignia of Knight Grand Commander of Humane Order of African Redemption.

Honours

As a manager 
Cameroon

 Africa Cup of Nations: 1988

Oman

 Arabian Gulf Cup: 2009

Orders

 This Knight Grand Commander of the Humane Order of African Redemption: 2018

References

Living people
1948 births
Association football midfielders
French footballers
Ligue 1 players
Ligue 2 players
FC Rouen players
AC Ajaccio players
AC Avignonnais players
Stade Lavallois players
Amiens SC players
French football managers
Amiens SC managers
Grenoble Foot 38 managers
Al Shabab Al Arabi Club managers
Expatriate football managers in the United Arab Emirates
Expatriate football managers in Cameroon
Cameroon national football team managers
Expatriate football managers in Senegal
Senegal national football team managers
Expatriate football managers in Malaysia
Malaysia national football team managers
1998 FIFA World Cup managers
Cambridge United F.C. managers
Expatriate football managers in the Democratic Republic of the Congo
Democratic Republic of the Congo national football team managers
Expatriate football managers in Ghana
Ghana national football team managers
Expatriate football managers in Oman
Oman national football team managers
Expatriate football managers in Syria
Syria national football team managers
Expatriate football managers in the Republic of the Congo
Congo national football team managers
Togo national football team managers
RC Strasbourg Alsace managers
Expatriate football managers in China
Beijing Renhe F.C. managers
Expatriate football managers in England
Ligue 1 managers
French expatriate football managers
1986 African Cup of Nations managers
1988 African Cup of Nations managers
1990 African Cup of Nations managers
1992 African Cup of Nations managers
2006 Africa Cup of Nations managers
2008 Africa Cup of Nations managers
2013 Africa Cup of Nations managers
2015 Africa Cup of Nations managers
2017 Africa Cup of Nations managers
French expatriate sportspeople in the Republic of the Congo
French people of Breton descent
French expatriate sportspeople in the United Arab Emirates
French expatriate sportspeople in Cameroon
French expatriate sportspeople in Syria
French expatriate sportspeople in Togo
French expatriate sportspeople in Ghana
French expatriate sportspeople in Oman
French expatriate sportspeople in China
French expatriate sportspeople in Malaysia
French expatriate sportspeople in England
French expatriate sportspeople in Senegal